The Treaty of Campo Formio (today Campoformido) was signed on 17 October 1797 (26 Vendémiaire VI) by Napoleon Bonaparte and Count Philipp von Cobenzl as representatives of the French Republic and the Austrian monarchy, respectively. The treaty followed the armistice of Leoben (18 April 1797), which had been forced on the Habsburgs by Napoleon's victorious campaign in Italy. It ended the War of the First Coalition and left Great Britain fighting alone against revolutionary France.

The treaty's public articles concerned only France and Austria and called for a Congress of Rastatt to be held to negotiate a final peace for the Holy Roman Empire. In the treaty's secret articles, Austria as the personal state of the Emperor promised to work with France to certain ends at the congress. Among other provisions, the treaty meant the definitive end to the ancient Republic of Venice, which was disbanded and partitioned by the French and the Austrians. 

The congress failed to achieve peace, and by early 1799 France and Austria were at war again. The new war, the War of the Second Coalition, ended with the Peace of Lunéville, a peace for the whole empire, in 1801.

Location
Campo Formio, now called Campoformido, is a village west of Udine in historical Friuli region in north-eastern Italy, in the middle between Austrian headquarters in Udine and Bonaparte's residence. The French commander resided at Villa Manin, the country mansion of Ludovico Manin, the last Doge of Venice, near Codroipo. The treaty was signed in an old house in the main square of the village, property of Bertrando Del Torre, a local merchant.

On 18 January 1798, Austrian troops entered Venice, and three days later, they held an official reception at the Doge's Palace, where Ludovico Manin was a guest of honour.

Terms

Beyond the usual clauses of "firm and inviolable peace", the treaty transferred a number of Austrian territories into French hands. Lands ceded included the Austrian Netherlands (most of modern Belgium). Territories of the Republic of Venice were divided between the two states: certain islands in the Mediterranean, including Corfu and other Venetian possessions in the Ionian Sea were turned over to the French. 

The city of Venice with Terraferma (Venetian mainland), Venetian Istria, Venetian Dalmatia and the Bay of Kotor region were turned over to the Habsburg emperor. Austria recognized the Cisalpine Republic and the newly created Ligurian Republic, formed of Genoese territories, as independent powers.

The states of the Kingdom of Italy formally ceased to owe fealty to the Holy Roman Emperor, ending the formal existence of the Kingdom of Italy, which as a personal holding of the Emperor, had existed de jure but not de facto since at least the 14th century.

The treaty contained secret clauses signed by Napoleon and representatives of the Holy Roman Emperor, which divided up certain other territories, made Liguria independent and agreed to the extension of the borders of France up to the Rhine, the Nette, and the Roer. Free French navigation was guaranteed on the Rhine, the Meuse and the Moselle. The French Republic had been expanded into areas that had never before been under French control.

The treaty was composed and signed after five months of negotiations. It was basically what had been agreed earlier at the Treaty of Leoben in April 1797, but the negotiations had been spun out by both parties for a number of reasons. During the negotiating period the French had to crush a royalist coup in September. That was used as a cause for the arrest and deportation of royalist and moderate deputies in the Directory.

Napoleon's biographer, Felix Markham, wrote "the partition of Venice was not only a moral blot on the peace settlement but left Austria a foothold in Italy, which could only lead to further war." In fact, the Peace of Campo Formio, though it reshaped the map of Europe and marked a major step in Napoleon's fame, was only a respite. One consequence was the Peasants' War, which erupted in the Southern Netherlands in 1798 following the French introduction of conscription.

As a result of the treaty, Gilbert du Motier, marquis de Lafayette, a prisoner from the French Revolution, was released from Austrian captivity.

By passing Venetian possessions in Greece, such as the Ionian Islands, to French rule, the treaty had an effect on later Greek history neither intended nor expected at the time.

References

Sources

External links
Traité de Campo-Formio (original document in French)
Treaty of Campo Formio (extracts in English)
Background to the Treaty
 

Campo Formio
Campo Formio
Modern history of Italy
1797 treaties
Campo Formio
Campo Formio
Croatia under Habsburg rule
1797 in Italy
1797 in Austria
1797 in France
1797 in the Republic of Venice
Austria–France relations
Campo Formio
Campo Formio
1797 in the Habsburg monarchy
French rule in the Ionian Islands (1797–1799)
France–Habsburg monarchy relations
Ligurian Republic
Cisalpine Republic
Fall of the Republic of Venice
Campo Formio
Napoleon